Cardus is a surname. Notable people with the surname include:

 Ana Cardus (born 1943), Mexican ballerina and ballet master
 Carlos Cardús (born 1959), Spanish motorcycle road racer
 Neville Cardus (1888-1975), English writer and critic
 Ricard Cardús (born 1988), Spanish motorcycle road racer, nephew of Carlos